23S rRNA pseudouridine2457 synthase (RluE, YmfC) is an enzyme with systematic name 23S rRNA-uridine2457 uracil mutase. This enzyme catalyses the following chemical reaction

 23S rRNA uridine2457  23S rRNA pseudouridine2457

The enzyme modifies uridine2457 in a stem of 23S RNA in Escherichia coli.

References

External links 
 

EC 5.4.99